Mount Whitcombe is a mountain in New Zealand's Southern Alps (Ka Tiritiri O Te Moana), rising to a height of .

Geography
Mount Whitcombe lies in the Southern Alps of the South Island. It is one of three mountains (along with Malcolm Peak and Mount Evans) which lie at the headwaters of the Rakaia, Wanganui, and Whitcombe Rivers. On the eastern side, the Ramsay Glacier feeds into the Rakaia River, and lies under the  Ramsay Face. The peak of Mount Whitcombe forms part of the boundary between the Canterbury and West Coast Regions.

Eponymy
Mount Whitcome was named after John Henry Whitcombe who was a surveyor for the Canterbury Provincial Council in 1862. During this expedition, in which the pair were ill-prepared, Whitcombe was swept into the Taramakau River and drowned. This tragic event resulted in Julius von Haast naming the pass the pair travelled, along with the mountain, Mount Whitcombe.

See also

 List of mountains of New Zealand by height

References

External links
http://climbnz.org.nz/nz/si/main-divide-of-the-southern-alps/mt-whitcombe

Mountains of Canterbury, New Zealand
Mountains of the West Coast, New Zealand
Southern Alps